Georgios Ladas (1913–1997) was a Cypriot politician born in Nicosia.

Ladas studied law, political and economic sciences in Athens. He was member of DIKO. He was elected President of the House of Representatives of Cyprus from 1981 to 1985.

References

Presidents of the House of Representatives (Cyprus)
1913 births
1997 deaths